This is a list of plants found in the wild in Amazon Rainforest vegetation of Brazil. The estimates from useful plants suggested that there are 800 plant species of economic or social value in this forest, 
according to Giacometti (1990).

Annonaceae 
Plant unknown

Apocynaceae 
 Aspidosperma 
 Aspidosperma oblongum A.DC.
 Hancornia 
Hancornia speciosa Gomes

Arecaceae
Attalea 
 Attalea speciosa
Aphandra 
 Aphandra natalia (Balslev & A.J.Hend.) Barfod
 Astrocaryum 
 Astrocaryum chambira Burret
 Astrocaryum faranae F.Kahn. & E.Ferreira
 Astrocaryum ferrugineum F.Kahn. & B.Millán
 Astrocaryum jauari Mart.
 Astrocaryum murumuru Mart.
 Astrocaryum vulgare Mart.
 Attalea 
 Attalea maripa (Aubl.) Mart.
 Bactris 
 Bactris gasipaes Kunth
 Chamaedorea
 Chamaedorea pinnatifrons
 Chelyocarpus
 Chelyocarpus ulei
 Desmoncus
 Desmoncus giganteus
 Desmoncus mitis
 Dictyocaryum
 Dictyocaryum ptarianum
 Euterpe  
 Euterpe oleracea Mart.
 Euterpe precatoria 
 Euterpe longevaginata
 Hyospathe
 Hyospathe elegans
 Iriartea
 Iriartea deltoidea
 Iriartella
 Iriartella stenocarpa
 Leopoldinia 
 Leopoldinia piassaba Wallace
 Lepidocaryum
 Lepidocaryum tenue
 Oenocarpus 
 Oenocarpus bacaba Mart.
 Oenocarpus balickii
 Oenocarpus bataua
 Socratea 
 Socratea exorrhiza Mart.
 Socratea salazari
 Syagrus
 Syagrus smithii
 Wettinia
 Wettinia augusta

Bromeliaceae
 Aechmea 
 Aechmea chantinii (Carrière) Baker
 Aechmea rodriguesiana (= Aechmea meeana E.Pereira & Reitz)

Chrysobalanaceae
 Acioa 
 Acioa edulis Prance
 Couepia 
 Couepia longipendula
 Licania 
 Licania rigida

Clusiaceae
 Platonia 
 Platonia insignis Mart. (= Aristoclesia esculenta Stuntz) - Bakury

Euphorbiaceae
 Alchornea 
 Alchornea castaneifolia (Bonpl. ex Willd.) A.Juss. - Iporuru
 Alchornea triplinervia (Spreng.) Müll.Arg.
 Croton 
 Croton lanjouwensis  
 Hevea 
 Hevea brasiliensis Müll.Arg. - Pará rubber tree or Seringueira
 Hura 
 Hura crepitans L. (= Hura brasiliensis Wild.)
 Manihot 
 Manihot esculenta - Manioc  
 Micrandropsis 
 Micrandropsis scleroxylon

Fabaceae

Caesalpinioideae
 Vouacapoua 
 Vouacapoua americana Aubl.

Heliconiaceae
 Heliconia 
 Heliconia burle-marxii Emygdio

Lecythidaceae
 Allantoma 
 Allantoma lineata Miers
 Couroupita 
 Couroupita guianensis Aubl.

Malpighiaceae
 Tetrapterys 
 Tetrapterys methystica R.E.Schult.

Malvaceae
 Apeiba 
 Apeiba albiflora Ducke
 Quararibea 
 Quararibea cordata Vischer

Meliaceae
 Carapa 
 Carapa guianensis Aubl.

Myrtaceae
 Eugenia  
 Eugenia stipitata McVaugh - Araza

Olacaceae
 Minquartia 
 Minquartia guianensis Aublet

Orchidaceae
 Cattleya 
 Cattleya violacea

Rubiaceae
Cinchona 
 Cinchona officinalis L.

See also
 List of plants of Atlantic Forest vegetation of Brazil
 List of plants of Caatinga vegetation of Brazil
 List of plants of Cerrado vegetation of Brazil
 List of plants of Pantanal vegetation of Brazil
 Official list of endangered flora of Brazil

References 

Amazon rainforest
 Amazon
 Amazon
Amazon
Amazon Rainforest
Brazil